Pang Wei (born 19 July 1986) is a Chinese Olympic sport shooter. He won a gold medal in the 10 metre air pistol at the 2008 Summer Olympics and a bronze medal in the same event at the 2016 Summer Olympics. He also won the 2006 ISSF World Shooting Championships in the same event, at the age of 20.

On 29 November 2009, Pang married two-time Olympic shooting champion Du Li in his hometown of Baoding, Hebei.

2008 Summer Olympics
Pang won the gold medal in the men's 10 metre air pistol at the 2008 Summer Olympics. Having won China's first Olympic gold medal in shooting, he was awarded 2,000,000 renminbi (US$292,600) from Chinese sponsors.

Major performances
2006 World Championships – 1st, 10 metre air pistol
2007 World Cup Final – 3rd, 10 metre air pistol
2007 National Intercity Games – 1st, 50 metre free pistol
2008 Summer Olympics – 10, metre air pistol

References

External links
 http://2008teamchina.olympic.cn/index.php/personview/personsen/4925 

1986 births
Living people
Sportspeople from Baoding
Sport shooters from Hebei
Chinese male sport shooters
ISSF pistol shooters
Olympic gold medalists for China
Olympic shooters of China
Shooters at the 2008 Summer Olympics
Shooters at the 2012 Summer Olympics
Shooters at the 2016 Summer Olympics
Shooters at the 2020 Summer Olympics
Olympic medalists in shooting
Medalists at the 2008 Summer Olympics
2016 Olympic bronze medalists for China
Asian Games medalists in shooting
Shooters at the 2006 Asian Games
Shooters at the 2010 Asian Games
Shooters at the 2014 Asian Games
Universiade medalists in shooting
Asian Games gold medalists for China
Asian Games silver medalists for China
Medalists at the 2006 Asian Games
Medalists at the 2010 Asian Games
Medalists at the 2014 Asian Games
Universiade silver medalists for China
Medalists at the 2011 Summer Universiade
Medalists at the 2013 Summer Universiade
Medalists at the 2020 Summer Olympics
Olympic bronze medalists for China